Arnaud Julius Stéphane Bandé (born 18 October 1993) is a Burkinabé international footballer who plays for US Ouagadougou, as a midfielder.

Career
He has played club football for US Ouagadougou.

He made his international debut for Burkina Faso in 2018.

References

1993 births
Living people
Burkinabé footballers
Burkina Faso international footballers
US Ouagadougou players
Association football midfielders
21st-century Burkinabé people
Burkina Faso A' international footballers
2018 African Nations Championship players